Amy Lin (born November 3, 1999) is a Taiwanese figure skater. She is the 2016 Toruń Cup bronze medalist, the 2016 Asian Open bronze medalist, and a four-time Taiwanese national champion (2016–2019). She has competed in the final segment at eight ISU Championships.

Personal life 
Lin was born on November 3, 1999 in Fremont, California. She has one older brother, James, who is a student at UC Berkeley. She trained in gymnastics, ballet, and Chinese dance while also skating before moving to Riverside, California.

Career

Early years 
Lin began skating at age four-and-a-half when her mother brought her children to a local ice rink. She represented the United States at one international event, the 2014 International Challenge Cup, finishing 7th on the junior level.

For Taiwan (Chinese Taipei) 
Lin began appearing internationally for Chinese Taipei (Taiwan) in the 2015–16 season. Making her senior international debut, she placed fourth at the Asian Open Trophy in August 2015. In September, she competed at her first ISU Junior Grand Prix (JGP) event, placing 10th in Colorado Springs, Colorado. Later that month, she finished 8th at her first ISU Challenger Series (CS) event, the 2015 U.S. International Classic. She was 7th at the 2015 CS Golden Spin of Zagreb.

In January 2016, Lin won the senior bronze medal at the Toruń Cup in Poland. In February, she competed at the 2016 Four Continents Championships in Taipei, placing 17th in the short program, 12th in the free skate, and 15th overall. In March, she finished 14th at the 2016 World Junior Championships in Debrecen, Hungary, having placed 22nd in the short and 11th in the free. She qualified for the final segment at the 2016 World Championships in Boston by placing 14th in the short program. Ranked 22nd in the free, she finished 21st overall.

Lin started off the 2016–17 season with a bronze medal at the Asian Open Trophy in August 2016. She placed eighth in the short program at JGP Japan before withdrawing due to injury. Post-competition examinations revealed a bone bruise in her left ankle. Consequently, she withdrew from all her fall events. Lin resumed full-time training in January 2017, after dealing with a succession of injuries that included an ankle sprain and shin splints.

Skating technique 
Unlike most skaters, Lin jumps and spins clockwise.

Programs

Competitive highlights 
CS: Challenger Series; JGP: Junior Grand Prix

For Taiwan

For the United States

References

External links 
 

1999 births
Taiwanese female single skaters
Figure skaters at the 2017 Asian Winter Games
Asian Games competitors for Chinese Taipei
Living people
People from Fremont, California
American sportspeople of Taiwanese descent